In Greek mythology, Iasus (Ancient Greek: Ἴασος) or Iasius (Ἰάσιος) was a king of Argos.

Family 
According to Hellanicus of Lesbos, Phoroneus had at least three sons: Agenor, Jasus (Iasus) and Pelasgus.

In Apollodorus' Bibliotheca, Iasus was the son of Argus and Ismene (daughter of Asopus) and thus brother of Argus Panoptes. In a Scholia on Euripides' Orestes, Triopas and Sois are called his parents and Pelasgus is his brother. Pausanias described Iasus as the son of Triopas (son of Phorbas) and brother of Agenor. Generally most scholars agree that Iasus was the father of Io by Leucane. Possibly by the latter, he also fathered Arestor, father of Pelasgus who migrated to Arcadia.

Reign 
After the death of Phoroneus, the two elder brothers, Pelasgus and Iasus, divided his dominions between themselves in such a manner that Pelasgus received the country about the river Erasmus, and built Larissa, and Iasus the country about Elis. After the death of these two, Agenor, the youngest, invaded their dominions, and thus became king of Argos. According to Pausanias, he was the successor of his father Triopas on the throne of Argos while his brother Agenor succeeded him as the king afterwards.

Notes

References 

 Apollodorus, The Library with an English Translation by Sir James George Frazer, F.B.A., F.R.S. in 2 Volumes, Cambridge, MA, Harvard University Press; London, William Heinemann Ltd. 1921. ISBN 0-674-99135-4. Online version at the Perseus Digital Library. Greek text available from the same website.
 Fowler, Robert L., Early Greek Mythography. Volume 2: Commentary. Oxford University Press. Great Clarendon Street, Oxford, OX2 6DP, United Kingdom. 2013. 
Pausanias, Description of Greece with an English Translation by W.H.S. Jones, Litt.D., and H.A. Ormerod, M.A., in 4 Volumes. Cambridge, MA, Harvard University Press; London, William Heinemann Ltd. 1918. . Online version at the Perseus Digital Library

 Pausanias, Graeciae Descriptio. 3 vols. Leipzig, Teubner. 1903.  Greek text available at the Perseus Digital Library.

Princes in Greek mythology
Kings of Argos
Kings in Greek mythology
Inachids
Mythology of Argos